Bocquet can refer to:

People
 Alain Bocquet (born 1946), French politician
 Anne Rosalie Bocquet Filleul (1752–1794), French painter 
 Bernard Bocquet (born 1949), French cyclist
 Didier Bocquet, French musician
 Éric Bocquet (born 1957), French politician
 Guy Sutton Bocquet (1882–1961), British Lieutenant-Colonel
 Laurent Bocquet ( 18th century), French dancer, choreographer and ballet master 
 Louis Bocquet (1922–1973), French racing cyclist
 Mlle Bocquet ( 17th century), French lutenist and composer
 Roger Bocquet (1921–1994), Swiss footballer
 Roland Bocquet (1878–1956), British composer, pianist and teacher

Other
 Charaxes bocqueti (Bocquet's demon charaxes), butterfly in the family Nymphalidae

See also
 Boquet (disambiguation)